Epitaph for George Dillon is an early John Osborne play, one of two he wrote in collaboration with Anthony Creighton (the other is Personal Enemy).  It was written before Look Back in Anger, the play which made Osborne's career, but opened a year after at Oxford Experimental Theatre in 1957, and was then produced at London's Royal Court theatre, where Look Back in Anger had debuted. It transferred to New York City shortly afterwards and garnered three Tony Award nominations.

Themes
The play tells the story of Kate Elliot's unhappy suburban South London family and the domestic havoc wrought when she decides to adopt George Dillon as a surrogate son.

It tackles typical Osborne themes, including religion (and Osborne's hatred thereof), vegetarianism, the casual deception of everyday life and scorn of the theatre.  In common with Jimmy Porter in Look Back in Anger, George Dillon is an intelligent man unable to find his place in the world.

London
It opened professionally at the Royal Court Theatre on 11 February 1958, in a production by William Gaskill, with the following cast (in order of appearance):
Wendy Craig ... Josie Elliot  
Yvonne Mitchell ... Ruth Gray  
Alison Leggatt ... Mrs. Elliot   
Avril Elgar ... Norah Elliot  
Toke Townley ... Percy Elliot
Robert Stephens ... George Dillon
Philip Locke ... Geoffrey Colwyn-Stuart
Paul Bailey ... Mr Webb  
Nigel Davenport ... Barney Evans

Critical reception
In The Observer, Kenneth Tynan called it "Powerful, honest and transfixing"; while in The Sunday Times, Harold Hobson wrote that the play "absorbs and fascinates because it is that rarest of theatrical phenomena, a realistic modern drama which is not bourgeois in its underlying assumptions. It is like a familiar building caught at an angle which suddenly makes it look like something never seen before."

Broadway
It made its debut on Broadway on 4 November 1958 starring Wendy Craig but was a failure and closed on 22 November 1958 after just 23 performances. Another version by new management and separately-financed opened during the same season on 12 January 1959, again starring Craig but was also a commercial failure playing for 48 performances, and closing on 21 February 1959. The first version received three Tony Award nominations - Best play; best direction (William Gaskill) and best actor (Robert Stephens).
Original Broadway cast
Wendy Craig ... Josie Elliot
Felix Deebank ... Barney Evans
Avril Elgar ... Norah Elliot
Frank Finlay ... Percy Elliot
Eileen Herlie ... Ruth Gray
Alison Leggatt ... Mrs. Elliot
Robert Stephens ... George Dillon
James Valentine... Geoffrey Colwyn-Stuart
David Vaughan ... Mr Webb

2005 London revival
A successful West End revival of the play ran at the Comedy Theatre from 27 September 2005 until 14 January 2006, directed by Peter Gill and starring Joseph Fiennes, Francesca Annis and Anne Reid.

It also featured Geoffrey Hutchings, Zoe Tapper, Dorothy Atkinson, Stephen Greif, Hugh Simon and Alex Dunbar.

Adaptations
In 1969, BBC radio broadcast a production starring John Hurt in the title role; and in 1994, another version starring Michael Maloney.

Online Reviews
 Guardian
 The Stage
 CurtainUp
 The British Theatre Guide
 Variety
 Anni Bruno

References

External links
 

1958 plays
Plays by John Osborne
Broadway plays